Jauza Fadhila Sugiarto (born 16 April 1999) is an Indonesian badminton player affiliated with Jaya Raya Jakarta club.

Personal life 
She's the youngest child of former World Champion Icuk Sugiarto and also the younger sister of Tommy, one of the elite men's singles player.

Achievements

BWF World Junior Championships 
Girls' doubles

Asian Junior Championships 
Girls' doubles

BWF International Challenge/Series (2 titles) 
Women's doubles

  BWF International Challenge tournament
  BWF International Series tournament

BWF Junior International (2 titles) 
Girls' doubles

  BWF Junior International Grand Prix tournament
  BWF Junior International Challenge tournament
  BWF Junior International Series tournament
  BWF Junior Future Series tournament

Performance timeline

National team 
 Junior level

Individual competitions 
 Junior level

 Senior level

References

External links 

 

1999 births
Living people
Sportspeople from Jakarta
Indonesian female badminton players
20th-century Indonesian women
21st-century Indonesian women